Randy Truitt is a former member of the Indiana House of Representatives representing District 26 which includes portions of Tippecanoe and Warren County. He was first elected to the Indiana House of Representatives in 2008. Prior to 2008, he was a member of the West Lafayette, Indiana City Council. After eight years in state government, Truitt did not re-run for election in 2016 and returned his focus to his real estate firm.

Truitt graduated from West Lafayette High School in 1986 and from Purdue University in 1990, receiving a bachelor's degree from the School of Technology. He later received his M.B.A. from Indiana Wesleyan University in 2002.

Truitt is married and has three children.

References

External links 
State Representative Randy Truitt official Indiana State Legislature site
Randy Truitt for State Representative official campaign website

Living people
Republican Party members of the Indiana House of Representatives
People from West Lafayette, Indiana
21st-century American politicians
Year of birth missing (living people)